Maricela González (born 8 December 1968) is a Colombian actress, best known for her role as La Felina  on La Doña 2. She is also known for her recurring roles on the television series Pasión prohibida (2013) and En otra piel (2014).

Filmography

Film roles

Television roles

Awards and nominations

References

External links 
 

1968 births
Living people
21st-century Colombian actresses
20th-century Colombian actresses
Mexican television actresses
Mexican telenovela actresses
Colombian telenovela actresses
Colombian television actresses